The 2013 Bethune–Cookman Wildcats football team represented Bethune-Cookman University in the 2013 NCAA Division I FCS football season. They were led by fourth-year head coach Brian Jenkins and played their home games at Municipal Stadium. They were a member of the Mid-Eastern Athletic Conference (MEAC). Bethune-Cookman finished the season 10–3, 7–1 in MEAC play to win a share of the conference championship with South Carolina State. Due to their win over South Carolina State, they received the conference's automatic bid to the FCS Playoffs, where they lost in the first round to Coastal Carolina.

Schedule

Ranking movements

References

Bethune-Cookman
Bethune–Cookman Wildcats football seasons
Black college football national champions
Mid-Eastern Athletic Conference football champion seasons
Bethune-Cookman